Greenwood was the name of a provincial electoral district in the Canadian province of British Columbia.  It was located in there Boundary Country west of Grand Forks around the city of Greenwood.  It first appeared on the hustings in the large redistribution prior to the 1903 election.  For the 1924 election it was merged with the Grand Forks riding to form Grand Forks-Greenwood.

For other historical and current provincial electoral districts in the Kootenay region, please see Kootenay (electoral districts).

Political geography and history 

When the Greenwood riding was formed the Boundary and Slocan mining districts were booming and Greenwood was not a city in name only (as it is today, proudly retaining the city status as official vestige of its wealthy past).  Like other ridings in the West Kootenay created in advance of the 1903 election out of the West Kootenay (south riding), during the glory days of the Kootenay and Boundary silver and galena booms.  Slocan, Kaslo, Rossland, Grand Forks, Nelson City, Ymir and other ridings were also created at this time out of the former West Kootenay (south riding)).

The need for extra ridings ended when the mining era did, and so as the population of Greenwood and neighbouring towns dwindled the Greenwood riding made its last appearance in the 1924 election and was merged with Grand Forks riding into Grand Forks-Greenwood.

Grand Forks-Greenwood remained on the hustings until 1966 when even lower populations resulted in a merger with the valley of the Similkameen river, also a mining district in decline and represented by Similkameen, which was combined with the smelter and railway towns of the Grand Forks-Greenwood area and the southern end of the Okanagana to form the new riding of Boundary-Similkameen.

For other historical and current electoral districts in the West Kootenay region, please see Kootenay (electoral districts).

Demographics

Political geography

Notable elections

Notable MLAs 

Bill Barlee, BC historian, TV host and folk pundit (ret.)

Electoral history 
Note:  Winners in each election are in bold.

|Liberal
|John Robert Brown 1
|align="right"|238
|align="right"|36.73%
|align="right"|
|align="right"|unknown

 
|Conservative
|James Ernest Spankie
|align="right"|181 	
|align="right"|27.93%
|align="right"|
|align="right"|unknown
|- bgcolor="white"
!align="right" colspan=3|Total valid votes
!align="right"|648
!align="right"|100.00%
!align="right"|
|- bgcolor="white"
!align="right" colspan=3|Total rejected ballots
!align="right"|
!align="right"|
!align="right"|
|- bgcolor="white"
!align="right" colspan=3|Turnout
!align="right"|%
!align="right"|
!align="right"|
|- bgcolor="white"
!align="right" colspan=7|The Vancouver Province newspaper gave 380, 332, and 265 respectively.
|}

|Liberal
|George Ratcliffe Naden
|align="right"|217
|align="right"|37.22%
|align="right"|
|align="right"|unknown
 
|Conservative
|Edward George Warren
|align="right"|190 	
|align="right"|32.59%
|align="right"|
|align="right"|unknown
|- bgcolor="white"
!align="right" colspan=3|Total valid votes
!align="right"|583 
!align="right"|100.00%
!align="right"|
|- bgcolor="white"
!align="right" colspan=3|Total rejected ballots
!align="right"|
!align="right"|
!align="right"|
|- bgcolor="white"
!align="right" colspan=3|Turnout
!align="right"|%
!align="right"|
!align="right"|
|- bgcolor="white"
!align="right" colspan=7|8  Sixteenth Premier of British Columbia.
|}

 
|Conservative
|John Robert Jackson 
|align="right"|260
|align="right"|42.07%
|align="right"|
|align="right"|unknown

|Liberal
|Alexander MacDonald
|align="right"|154 	
|align="right"|24.92%
|align="right"|
|align="right"|unknown
|- bgcolor="white"
!align="right" colspan=3|Total valid votes
!align="right"|618 	
!align="right"|100.00%
!align="right"|
|- bgcolor="white"
!align="right" colspan=3|Total rejected ballots
!align="right"|
!align="right"|
!align="right"|
|- bgcolor="white"
!align="right" colspan=3|Turnout
!align="right"|%
!align="right"|
!align="right"|
|}

 
|Conservative
|John Robert Jackson 
|align="right"|364
|align="right"|78.11%
|align="right"|
|align="right"|unknown
|- bgcolor="white"
!align="right" colspan=3|Total valid votes
!align="right"|466 
!align="right"|100.00%
!align="right"|
|- bgcolor="white"
!align="right" colspan=3|Total rejected ballots
!align="right"|
!align="right"|
!align="right"|
|- bgcolor="white"
!align="right" colspan=3|Turnout
!align="right"|%
!align="right"|
!align="right"|
|}

 
|Conservative
|John Robert Jackson 
|align="right"|205 	
|align="right"|29.45%
|align="right"|
|align="right"|unknown

|Liberal
|John Duncan MacLean 
|align="right"|491
|align="right"|70.55%
|align="right"|
|align="right"|unknown
|- bgcolor="white"
!align="right" colspan=3|Total valid votes
!align="right"|696  
!align="right"|100.00%
!align="right"|
|- bgcolor="white"
!align="right" colspan=3|Total rejected ballots
!align="right"|
!align="right"|
!align="right"|
|- bgcolor="white"
!align="right" colspan=3|Turnout
!align="right"|%
!align="right"|
!align="right"|
|}

Sources 
Elections BC Historical Returns

Former provincial electoral districts of British Columbia